In London is the debut studio album by Australian-born Irish singer and composer Johnny Logan. In 1979, Readers of the Connaught Telegraph in Ireland voted Johnny Logan as Best New Male Artist.
The album was released a year before he went on to win the 1980 Eurovision Song Contest. Following that, "In London/Sad Little Women" was released internationally and charted in Germany and Belgium.

Track listing
LP/Cassette

References

Johnny Logan (singer) albums
1979 debut albums